This is a List of New Jersey railroad junctions, present and past.

Abbreviations used in the table:
ACRR = Atlantic City Railroad
B&O = Baltimore and Ohio Railroad
BRW = Blairstown Railway
C&A = Camden and Amboy Railroad
CNJ = Central Railroad of New Jersey
CSAO = Conrail Shared Assets Operations
DLW = Delaware, Lackawanna and Western Railroad
ERIE = Erie Railroad
EL = Erie Lackawanna Railroad
LHR = Lehigh and Hudson River Railway
LV = Lehigh Valley Railroad
NJT = New Jersey Transit
LNE = Lehigh & New England
M&E = Morristown & Erie Railway
NS = Norfolk Southern
NYC = New York Central Railroad
NY&GL = New York and Greenwood Lake Railway
NYSW = New York, Susquehanna and Western Railway
PRR = Pennsylvania Railroad
P-RSL = Pennsylvania–Reading Seashore Lines
RDG = Reading Railroad
SIRT = Staten Island Rapid Transit Railroad
WJ&S = West Jersey and Seashore Railroad
W&DR = Williamstown and Delaware River Railroad
Line names may not be official, but serve to identify the line.

References

Junctions
N